Freddie Robarts is a Fijian former professional rugby league footballer who represented Fiji in the 2000 World Cup.

Playing career
A Bay Roskill Vikings junior, Robarts played for the Te Atatu Roosters in the Auckland Rugby League competition. In 1992 he represented an Auckland-based Pacific XIII that beat the New Zealand Māori rugby league team 46–42.

Along with his brother Phil,  played for the Waitakere City Raiders in the Lion Red Cup between 1994 and 1995.

He won the ARL's best and fairest award in 1998 and 1999 representing Te Atatu Roosters, becoming the only player ever to win the award in back to back seasons. He also won the Lipscombe Cup for sportsman of the year in 1999. Robarts also played for Auckland.

In 2000 Robarts represented Fiji at the Millennium World Cup, playing in all three of Fiji's matches.

References

Living people
Fijian rugby league players
Fiji national rugby league team players
Bay Roskill Vikings players
Te Atatu Roosters players
Rugby league hookers
Rugby league props
Rugby league second-rows
Auckland rugby league team players
1970s births
Waitakere rugby league team players
Fijian emigrants to New Zealand